Filip Stojanovski (born 1 December 1996) is a Macedonian footballer playing with FK Skopje in the Macedonian First League.

Club career
Born in Macedonian capital of Skopje, Stojkovski played with youth team of FK Vardar. He made his debut as senior in the championship winning season of 2014–15. The following season he played on loan with FK Ljubanci 1974. In June 2016 he signed with FK Sileks, however, by August same year he moved to Albania and signed with KF Apolonia Fier playing with them in the 2016–17 Albanian First Division. During thee winter-breal of the 2017–18 season, he moved to Serbia and signed with FK Radnički Pirot playing the 2017–18 Serbian First League.
At the end of the season 17–18, he returns to Macedonia and signs for FK Makedonija Gjorče Petrov from the First Macedonian League, where he recorded 17 appearances, due to good games, in the summer transfer period 2019, signing for FK Shkupi. After the good games for FK Shkupi, he transferred to Kosovo to the team KF Ferizaj

International career
He played for Macedonia U-19 and U-21 national teams.

Honours
Vardar
 Macedonian First League: 2014–15

References

1996 births
Living people
Footballers from Skopje
Association football defenders
Macedonian footballers
North Macedonia youth international footballers
North Macedonia under-21 international footballers
FK Vardar players
FK Ljubanci 1974 players
KF Apolonia Fier players
FK Radnički Pirot players
FK Makedonija Gjorče Petrov players
FK Shkupi players
KF Ferizaj players
Macedonian First Football League players
Macedonian Second Football League players
Kategoria e Parë players
Serbian First League players
Football Superleague of Kosovo players
Macedonian expatriate footballers
Expatriate footballers in Albania
Macedonian expatriate sportspeople in Albania
Expatriate footballers in Serbia
Macedonian expatriate sportspeople in Serbia
Expatriate footballers in Kosovo
Macedonian expatriate sportspeople in Kosovo